The canton of Nord-Lévezou is an administrative division of the Aveyron department, southern France. It was created at the French canton reorganisation which came into effect in March 2015. Its seat is in Luc-la-Primaube.

It consists of the following communes:
Flavin
Luc-la-Primaube
Olemps
Sainte-Radegonde

References

Cantons of Aveyron